NGC 179 is a lenticular galaxy located 3.3 million light-years away in the constellation Cetus. It was discovered in 1886 by Francis Preserved Leavenworth.

See also 
 List of NGC objects (1–1000)

References

External links 
 
 SEDS

0179
Lenticular galaxies
Astronomical objects discovered in 1886
Cetus (constellation)